Ronaldo Green (born 1 August 2000) is a Bahamian footballer who plays for UB Mingoes of the BFA Senior League.

Club career
As a youth, Green came up through the ranks of Western Warriors SC and featured for the senior side in the domestic BFA Senior League. In July 2021 he joined up with Waterford F.C. of the League of Ireland Premier Division. The following October he signed a professional contract with the club following the successful trial. He made his professional debut for the club on 25 October 2021 in a 2021 FAI Cup semi-finals match against Bohemian.

Waterford manager Marc Bircham described Green as a "young lad from the Bahamas with big potential" that he had been monitoring since his early days as manager at the club. Following the season, Waterford was relegated to the League of Ireland First Division with forty two points, the most ever earned by a relegated club.

By October 2022, following his departure from Waterford, Green returned to the BFA Senior League and joined the UB Mingoes of the University of the Bahamas. In the first match of the 2022–23 season, Green scored four goals in a 5–3 victory over Renegades FC. About the performance, Mingoes assistant manager Alex Thompson said, "The win also solidifies Green as  the best player in the league on the best up and coming team. He had four goals today and could have had a few more and a few more assists."

References

External links

UB Mingoes profile

2000 births
Living people
Bahamian footballers
Association football midfielders
Expatriate association footballers in the Republic of Ireland
League of Ireland players
Waterford F.C. players